is a Japanese international table tennis player. She is the most successful player on the ITTF Challenge Series since its inception in 2017. Owing to her stature, she is able to generate powerful spins on both wings more so than most female players.

Career

Junior
Hayata was a member of Japanese girls' team winning gold at the 2016 World Junior Table Tennis Championships. She also won silver in girls' doubles and mixed doubles.

She won the bronze medal in women's doubles at the 2017 World Table Tennis Championships with Mima Ito. She won several doubles titles in the ITTF World Tour, including the Grand Finals in 2016 and 2018.

2019–2020
In the ITTF Portugal Open 2019, she caused a major upset by beating 4-time Women's World Cup Champion Liu Shiwen 4–3. She went on to beat another Chinese player Hu Limei before winning the tournament by defeating her compatriot Honoka Hashimoto in the finals.

In January 2020, she won the All Japan Table Tennis Championships for the first time, shocking reigning champion Mima Ito in the semi-finals and then defeating Kasumi Ishikawa in the finals.

2021
Hayata lost to Mima Ito 4–3 in the 2021 All Japan Table Tennis Championships. Hayata played in WTT Doha in March 2021. In the WTT Contender event, she upset Kasumi Ishikawa and advanced to the finals to once again face Mima Ito. Hayata lost to Ito 4–2 in the finals.

Singles titles

References

External links

Japanese female table tennis players
Living people
2000 births
World Table Tennis Championships medalists